The sensory organs of gastropods (snails and slugs) include olfactory organs, eyes, statocysts and mechanoreceptors. Gastropods have no sense of hearing.

Olfactory organs 

In terrestrial gastropods the most important sensory organs are the olfactory organs which are located on the tips of the 4 tentacles. Some terrestrial gastropods can track the odor of food using their tentacles (tropotaxis) and the wind (anemotaxis).

In opisthobranch marine gastropods, the chemosensory organs are two protruding structures on top of the head. These are known as rhinophores. An opisthobranch sea slug Navanax inermis has chemoreceptors on the sides of its mouth to track mucopolysaccharides in the slime trails of prey, and of potential mates.

The freshwater snail Bithynia tentaculata is capable of detecting the presence of molluscivorous (mollusk-eating) leeches through chemoreception, and of closing its operculum to avoid predation.

The deepwater snail Bathynerita naticoidea can detect mussel beds containing the mussel Bathymodiolus childressi, because it is attracted to water that has cues in it from this species of mussel.

Eyes  

In terrestrial pulmonate gastropods, eye spots are present at the tips of the tentacles in the Stylommatophora or at the base of the tentacles in the Basommatophora. These eye spots range from simple ocelli that cannot project an image (simply distinguishing light and dark), to more complex pit and even lens eyes. Vision is not the most important requirement in terrestrial gastropods, because they are mainly nocturnal animals.

Some gastropods, for example the freshwater apple snails (family Ampullariidae) and marine species of genus Strombus can completely regenerate their eyes. The gastropods in both of these families have lens eyes.

Morphological sequence of different types of multicellular eyes exemplified by gastropod eyes:

Lens eyes 
{|
||[[File:Bolinus brandaris eye.png|left|thumb|Lens eye of Bolinus brandaris.]]
||
||
|}

another drawing of eye of Helix pomatia

 Statocysts 

In the statocysts of Haliotis asinina'' was found the expression of a conserved gene (Pax-258 gene), which is also important for forming structures for balance in eumetazoans.

Mechanoreceptors 

The mechanoreceptors are very crucial to the snail's sensory.

See also 
 Hancock's organ
 Sensory ecology
 Sensory systems in fish

References 
This article incorporates CC-BY-2.0 text from the reference

Further reading 
 Sergei Tschachotin. 1908. Die Statocyste der Heteropoden. Heidelberg, Univ., Diss., (Zeitschrift f. wissenschaftl. Zoologie; Bd. 90; S. 343–422).

External links 

Gastropod anatomy
Sensory organs in animals